James Huth (born 29 August 1947 in Sutton, Greater London) is an English-born French film director, screenwriter and producer, mostly known for his collaborations with actor Jean Dujardin.

Filmography

References

External links

French male screenwriters
French screenwriters
French film directors
Living people
1947 births